James FitzJames may refer to:
 James FitzJames, 1st Duke of Berwick (1670–1734)
 James Fitzjames (27 July 1813 – after 22 April 1848), British naval officer
 James Fitzjames Duff, English educator
 James Fitzjames Stephen, English lawyer and judge

See also